Amanollah Jahanbani (1891 – 1 February 1974) was a member of the Qajar dynasty and a senior general of Reza Shah Pahlavi.

Early life and education
Jahanbani was born in 1895. He was the great grandson of Fath Ali Shah. At the age of 10, Jahānbāni was sent to St. Petersburg for schooling, where he attended the Mihailovsky Artillery College and the Nikolaevsky War Academy. He returned to Iran as a ranked military officer in World War I.

He furthermore served in the Persian Cossack Brigade and was a pivotal figure in the 1921 Persian coup d'état.

Career
After completing his studies in Europe, Jahanbani joined Cossack forces and became a major general. On 6 December 1921 Jahanbani was named the commander of gendarmerie headquarters following the dissolution of the Cossack Division by Reza Shah. He was appointed the chief of the staff with the rank of brigadier general at the beginning of the 1920s. As of 1925 he was the head of military academy. In 1928, he led the army in Balochistan attack to control the resistance. His path of success continued until 1938, when he fell out of favor and was suddenly thrown into the Qasr prison by Reza Shah Pahlavi. However, in 1941 he was interior minister.

With Reza Shah's abdication during World War II, his political life saw some luck again and he was appointed to the Senate during the era of Mohammad Reza Shah Pahlavi where he served during five consecutive periods.

Personal life and death
Jahanbani married twice. He had nine children. His second wife, Helen Kasminsky, bore him four children; Nader, Parviz, Khosrow, and Mehr Moneer. Nader became the deputy head of the Imperial Iranian Air Force, Parviz was an officer in the Imperial Iranian Marines, and Khosrow is the second husband of Princess Shahnaz Pahlavi. Amanullah is the father-in-law of Captain Nasrollah Amanpour, the uncle of CNN journalist Christiane Amanpour.

Jahanbani died in 1974 at the age of 83.

Jahanbani wrote the book "Iranian Soldier: Meaning of Water and Soil", the story of his life periods like, educating and serving. This book was published in 2001 with efforts of his son, Parviz Jahanbani.

References

Other sources
'Alí Rizā Awsatí (عليرضا اوسطى), Iran in the Past Three Centuries (Irān dar Se Qarn-e Goz̲ashteh - ايران در سه قرن گذشته), Volumes 1 and 2 (Paktāb Publishing - انتشارات پاکتاب, Tehran, Iran, 2003).  (Vol. 1),  (Vol. 2).

20th-century Iranian politicians
1895 births
1974 deaths
Interior Ministers of Iran
Governors of East Azerbaijan Province
Imperial Iranian Army lieutenant generals
Iranian expatriates in Russia
Military Engineering-Technical University alumni
Qajar princes
Politicians from Tehran